SK hynix Inc. is a South Korean supplier of dynamic random-access memory (DRAM) chips and flash memory chips. Hynix is the world's second-largest memory chipmaker (after Samsung Electronics) and the world's third-largest semiconductor company. Founded as Hyundai Electronic Industrial Co., Ltd. in 1983 and known as Hyundai Electronics, the company has manufacturing sites in Korea, the United States, mainland China and Taiwan. In 2012, when SK Telecom became its major shareholder, Hynix merged with SK Group (the third largest conglomerate in South Korea).

The company's major customers include Microsoft, Apple, Asus, Dell, MSI, HP Inc., and Hewlett Packard Enterprise (formerly Hewlett-Packard). Other products that use Hynix memory include DVD players, cellular phones, set-top boxes, personal digital assistants, networking equipment, and hard disk drives.

History
 1949: Founded as Gukdo construction.
 1983: Incorporated and renamed as Hyundai Electronics Industries Co., Ltd.
 1985: Started mass production of 256K DRAM under a licensing agreement with U.S. company Vitelic Corporation.
 1986: The Hyundai-manufactured Blue Chip PC was sold in discount and toy stores throughout the US. It is one of the earliest PC clones marketed toward consumers instead of business
 1993: Took over Maxtor (US HDD main factory)
 1996: Initial public offering on the Korea Stock Exchange
 1999: Merged with LG Semiconductor Co., Ltd (founded in 1979), then a division of LG Electronics.
 2000: Spun off Hyundai Image Quest, Hyundai Autonet and Hyundai Calibration & Certification Technologies
 2001: Changed the company name to Hynix Semiconductor Inc. (from Hyundai Electronics); spun off Hyundai Syscomm, Hyundai CuriTel, and Hyundai Networks; completed spin-off from Hyundai Group
 2002: Sold HYDIS, TFT-LCD Business Unit
 2004: Signed System IC Business Transfer Agreement with System Semiconductor
 2005: Emerged from Corporate Restructuring Promotion Act ahead of schedule. Fined US$185M for involvement in DRAM price fixing cartel
 2006: Posted record the highest revenues since foundationEstablished global manufacturing network with complete construction of Hynix-ST Semiconductor Inc.Hynix's wholly owned manufacturing subsidiary in China
 2007: Appointed Jong-Kap Kim as the new Chairman & CEO
 2009: Company put up for sale by its lenders after it defaulted on loans and a subsequent debt-equity swap
 2010: Fine of €51.47 million for illegally fixing prices with eight other memory chip makers.In January 2010, Hynix Semiconductor Inc was put up for sale in an auction valued at close to $3 billion.On 31 August 2010, HP announced collaboration with Hynix to bring memristor to high volume manufacturing step (targeted for 2013).
 2012: SK Group, the third-largest conglomerate in South Korea, acquired a 21.05% stake in Hynix.
 2013: Fab 1 and Fab 2 in China both suffered a massive fire which took the factories offline temporarily.
 2014: SK hynix acquired the firmware division of Softeq Development FLLC to make it part of its global R&D network alongside Italy-based Ideaflash S.r.l, Link_A_Media Devices and Violin Memory in the US, and Taiwanese Innostor Technology.
 2020: Hynix announced agreement to purchase Intel's NAND business for $9 billion, which closed in 2021. This spinoff created a new company, Solidigm, fully owned by SK Hynix.

Products

Hynix produces a variety of semiconductor memories, including:
 Computing memory
 Consumer and network memory
 Graphics memory
 Mobile memory 
 NAND flash
 CMOS image sensors
 Solid-state drives (SSDs)

Treatment of employees

Illegal pay-cut
According to SK Hynix's "Annual Salary Rules", the employment rules for office workers, employees are to be paid from 90% to 110% of the contract wage depending on their annual evaluation. However, a so-called "Self-Design" system was introduced in 2018, allowing managers to adjust each employee's salary. Under this system, differences in wages between departments and individuals can occur even if they receive the same evaluation. It is a zero-sum where the head of the organization distributes a limited budget to his employees. Under this wage system, only 60 percent of the annual salary is guaranteed. It has been reported that a majority of employees in a specific department received less than 90% of the contract salary.

In 2020, SK Hynix Labor Union submitted a petition to the Gyeonggi Provincial Labor Relations Commission and sent an official letter to the company. In response, the company held a briefing session on the "Self-Design" system and tried to ask the consent of employees. The briefing session and consent process has many procedural defects, which caused more controversy.

Deceptive revision of employment rules
When the above-mentioned pay-cut became controversial, SK Hynix held a briefing session to ask consent of the employees. It transpired that:

 They did not show the 'before and after' of the Employment Rules. 
 They did not tell that it is a vote to decide whether the Employment Rules should be revised, thus most of the employees did not know that.
 Some directors and team leaders forced their employees to sign the agreement against each employee's free will.
 It was technically impossible to vote against the revision. 
 Many employees realized that they were deceived and asked a retraction of their vote, but the HR department refused.
 Even though it was a briefing session, there was various tools such as screenshot prevention which implies that such a briefing session is not to be justified.

Workers who have been disadvantaged by wage cuts due to changes in the company's employment rules can later claim the amount of their lost wages to the company. In addition, according to the Supreme Court's ruling, even if the employment rules are changed later through due process, favorable contents in the previous labor contract shall prevail for workers who do not agree to change the employment rules.

2020 incentive bonus controversy

In January 2021, employees complained about the decision to pay a bonus of 20% of their annual salary. This is because performance-based bonuses were less than half of Samsung Electronics' peers. Samsung Electronics' sales and operating profit are far above SK Hynix's, so there is no reason to pay the same performance-based bonus simply because of its increased operating profit, but the amount of performance-based bonus has not changed at all compared to 19 years. Sales and operating profit increased by 18.2% and 84.3% compared to 19 years, but the scale of performance-based bonuses has been set due to the management's unilateral notification.

Due to the nature of the semiconductor industry, which is actively moving to the same industry, attracting manpower is important, but due to the reform of various wage systems, there has been a controversy over performance-based pay.

See also

 List of semiconductor fabrication plants

References

External links

 
 SK Hynix Supplied AI Memories

 
Anti-competitive practices
Companies listed on the Korea Exchange
Computer memory companies
Electronics companies established in 1983
Electronics companies of South Korea
Hyundai Group
Price fixing convictions
Semiconductor companies of South Korea
Hynix
South Korean brands
South Korean companies established in 1983
Technology companies established in 1983
Technology companies of South Korea